, known by his stage name Ya Chang, is a Japanese actor, comedian, and recording artist currently active in the Philippines.

Career
He was a businessman in Gunma, Japan before he went to the Manila, Philippines just to meet Jopay Paguia of Sexbomb Girls. He was present always in Eat Bulaga! where he was discovered. He then became a host of MTB: Ang Saya-Saya. He appeared in ABS-CBN TV shows such as Aalog-Alog and Quizon Avenue. He also appeared in the drama anthology Maalaala Mo Kaya to portray his own life story, and also assisted the show's crew on their first episode that was set in Japan. He also appeared as Kenjie in ABS-CBN's Eva Fonda, acting as an antagonist for the first time.

He also appeared on Dobol Trobol: Lets Get Redi 2 Rambol! as a guest and Nobody, Nobody But... Juan as a Japanese officer during Japanese Occupation of the Philippines. He also appeared as an engineer for Lim Aviations in ABS-CBN's Be Careful With My Heart. He is also a presenter for the travel show Biyaheng Bulilit, along with Tatay Nishii and Cha-cha "Bulilit" Cañete.

Now, he appears in TV5 as a host after Amachan Hallo Hallo Café to do contest to viewers and his co-hosts.

Discography

Filmography

Television

Movies

References

External links 

Japanese comedians
Japanese male television actors
Japanese male singers
Japanese emigrants to the Philippines
Living people
Star Magic
People from Gunma Prefecture
Musicians from Gunma Prefecture
Year of birth missing (living people)